Zahir-od-dowleh Cemetery is located in Darband, close to Tajrish, Shemiran (now a neighbourhood inside Tehran's city limits) and many Iranian artists, poets and musicians are buried there.

Notable burials 
 Ali Khan Zahir od-Dowleh (fa) (1864–1924) – Sufi leader
 Gholamhossein Darvish (1872–1926) – musician
 Prince Iraj Mirza (1874–1926) – Qajar prince and poet
 Seifeddin Kermanshahi (fa) (1876–1932) – playwright
 Princess Zahra Khanom Taj os-Saltaneh (1883–1936) – Qajar princess
 Habib Samaei (fa) (1905–1941) – musician
 Sharafeddin Qahramani (fa) (1900–1942) – author
 Musa Hakimi Nazm os-Saltaneh (fa) (1864–1944) – constitutionalist
 Hassan-Ali Mostashar Mostashar ol-Molk (fa) (1879–1945) – politician
 Mohammad Masoud (ru) (1901–1947) – journalist
 Prince Mohammad-Sadegh Morza Moezz od-Dowleh (fa) (1866–1948) – Qajar prince
 Mohammd-Hossein Loghman Adham (fa) (1879–1950) – physician
 Mohammad Taqi Bahar (1884–1951) – poet and scholar
 Gholamreza Rashid Yasemi (1895–1951) – poet
 Hossein Hangafarin (fa) (1875–1952) – musician
 Reza Mahjubi (1898–1954) – musician
 Hossein Taherzadeh (fa) (1882–1955) – singer
 Hassan Loghman Adham (fa) (1884–1957) – politician
 Abolhasan Saba (1902–1957) – musician
 Qamar-ol-Moluk Vaziri (1905–1959) – singer
 Dariush Rafiei (fa) (1927–1959) – singer
 Esmail Marzban (fa) (1867–1960) – politician
 Mohammad-Mehdi Obehi (fa) (1873–1960) – politician
 Hossein Saba (fa) (1924–1960) – musician
 Fazlollah Mohtadi Sobhi (fa) (1897–1962) – writer
 Nosratollah Montaser (fa) (1899–1965) – mayor of Teheran
 Morteza Mahjoubi (1899–1965) – musician
 Ruhollah Khaleqi (1906–1965) – musician
 Ahmad Nakhjavan (ru) (1893–1966) – IIAF general and chief of staff (1925–36)
 Forough Farrokhzad (1934–1966) – poet
 Hossein Masrour (fa) (1890–1968) – writer
 Hossein Yahaghi (fa) (1903–1968) – musician
 Mohammad-Hassan Rahi Moayyeri (1909–1968) – poet
 Hassan Taqizadeh (1876–1969) – politician and veteran constitutionalist
 Masoud Moazed (fa) (d. 1969) – politician
 Ebrahim Mansouri (fa) (1899–1969) – musician
 Moshir Homayoun Shahrdar (fa) (1885–1970) – musician
 Jahanbakht Tofigh (1931–1970) – wrestler
 Sobhi Fazl'ollah Mohtadi (1897–1962) – Author
 Ali Eghbal (fa) (1899–1972) – politician
 Mohammad Ameri (fa) (1889–1973) – politician
 Hossein Tehrani (1912–1974) – musician
 Ahmad Vosough (fa) (1899–1975) – IIA general
 Farid Khaz'al (fa) (1927–1975) – IIN general
 Nasrollah Saba (fa) (1886–1977) – politician
 Giti Amir-Khosravi (fa) (1895–1977) – musician
 Nur-Ali Borumand (de) (1905–1977) – musician
 Fazael Tadayon (1908–1977) – IIAF general and chief of staff (1975–77)
 Ali Neshat (1923–1979) – Imperial Guard general

Gallery

References

External links 
 
 
 A short biography of Mirza Ali-Khan Zahir od-Dowleh, The Group Weblog of the Archivists of Iran (وبلاگ گروهی آرشیویستهای ایران), in Persian
 A photograph of Mirza Ali-Khan Zahir od-Dowleh
 

Neighbourhoods in Tehran
Cemeteries in Tehran